Liquidambar cambodiana, commonly known as sdey, is a tree in the Altingiaceae family endemic to south west Cambodia.

Taxonomy
The species was originally named Altingia cambodiana in 1924 by the French botanist Paul Henri Lecomte (1856-1934). In 2013, US botanists Stefanie M. Ickert-Bond and Jun Wen (born 1963) demonstrated that it was in the Altingiaceae family and Liquidambar genus.

Description
The taxa grows as a tree from 8 to 10m tall.  
The species is differentiated from other Liquidambar by having leaves that are glossy on the upper surface and with margins that are distinctly revolute when dry.

Distribution
The tree is reported from 3 locations in the Dâmrei Mountains of southwestern Cambodia. It was reported in the riparian forests in basalt areas (and perhaps more widely) of the Chuor Phnom Krâvanh/Cardamon Mountains of western Cambodia, the tree dominates the riverbanks. However the botanist Ickert-Bond visited Bokor National Park around 2013, and for several days attempted to find specimens with no luck, and identified stands near the Pokovil waterfall in the Dâmrei Mountains as being a population of Liquidambar siamensis
It grows from lowlands areas up to 500m in altitude.

Conservation
This plant has not been found in the last few decades. Therefore its conservation status has been described as Data Deficient. As it is only known from 3 archived specimens from one location it is believed that this taxa has a small population size, in an area with expanding tourism impacts and resource extraction.

Vernacular names
sdey (Khmer language)

Uses
The young leaves of the tree are eaten raw in salads, they are an appreciated food and are particularly eaten in the dish tük kröeung. The wood is used to make tool handles.

References

cambodiana
Edible plants
Endemic flora of Cambodia
Plants described in 2013